Paradise Garage, also known as "the Garage" or the "Gay-rage", was a New York City discotheque notable in the history of dance and pop music, as well as LGBT and nightclub cultures.  The  club was founded by sole proprietor Michael Brody, and occupied a building formerly located at 84 King Street in the SoHo neighborhood. It operated from 1977 to 1987 and featured resident DJ Larry Levan.

The Garage is credited with influencing the development of modern nightclubs, and is cited as a direct inspiration for London's Ministry of Sound.  Unlike other venues of its time, Paradise Garage promoted dancing rather than verbal interaction, and it was the first to place the DJ at the center of attention. It was known for its enthusiastic-yet-unforgiving nature toward performers.  It hosted many notable musicians including Diana Ross and a young Madonna. In 1979, Tim Curry released the album Fearless, containing the single "Paradise Garage", whose lyrics narrate visiting the discotheque.

History

Physical space 
Paradise Garage derived its name from the building's origin as an early automobile parking structure.  Its initial certificate of occupancy, dated March 26, 1925, identifies the architect of the two-story commercial building at 80-86 King Street as Victor Mayper.

Michael Brody's imprint on the space began in 1977 with the club opening as 84 King Street Garage.  After a year-long renovation, it officially became Paradise Garage on January 28, 1978.  Among the improvements were a sprung dancefloor and custom sound system, developed by Richard Long of Richard Long & Associates (RLA).  The club's main room layout and dancefloor were reportedly purpose-designed around the sound system, which is said to have been the best in New York City at that time and described by François Kevorkian as a "temple of music."

The venue initially accommodated 750 patrons, but a 1984 expansion raised its legal capacity to 1,400 people and added a rooftop lounge styled after the coastal scrubland and beachside villas of nearby Fire Island Pines, where Brody owned a summer home.

After 11 years of operation, The Garage's lease ended on October 1, 1987.  The building later reverted to use as truck depot by Verizon Communications.  In April 2018, it was demolished and replaced by high-rise luxury condominiums.

Culture 
The Garage was largely modeled on David Mancuso's private invitation-only DJ parties at The Loft.  Admission to the club was only available to members and their guests, with an interview process used to select members.  In order to avoid New York City restrictions on bar and restaurant hours-of-operation, snacks and beverages were freely available to patrons and no liquor was served.  These measures allowed the club to stay open afterhours, often until 10:00 AM or even later the following day.

In contrast to its well-known contemporary Studio 54, The Garage fostered a distinctly no-frills, egalitarian atmosphere, as reminisced by one of its former dancers:

The club hosted a number of charity events, benefitting organizations like Gay Men's Health Crisis (GMHC) and U.S. Fund for UNICEF.  As of 2008, the Paradise Garage trademark is owned by GMHC.

Music 

Paradise Garage was an epicenter for early pioneers of dance music under the curation of resident DJ Larry Levan.  The unique and eclectic styles of disco and dance music featured at the Garage gave rise to descriptive encompassing terms like New York house, "garage", "garage style", and "garage classic" (to describe a record that was made famous at, or associated with, the club).

Although the term "garage music" (not to be confused with UK garage) does not exclusively mean house music, the latter saw extensive development and promotion among Levan and his contemporaries, Frankie Knuckles and Nicky Siano. Nonetheless, these DJs played all kinds of music at Paradise Garage so long as it was danceable; for example, The Clash and The Police, as well as traditional "disco" artists like Gwen Guthrie and Sylvester.

Among those who benefitted from what became known as "The Garage Sound" or "Garage Music" was Mel Cheren, a partial-backer of the club and owner of New York label West End Records. West End's successes included such hits as "Sessomatto" by Sessa Matto, "Hot Shot" by Karen Young, "Heartbeat" by Taana Gardner (remixed by Levan), "Do It to the Music" by Raw Silk, and "Don't Make Me Wait" by the Peech Boys (produced by Levan). West End Records folded for a number of years, then re-opened in the late 1990s and released one of Levan's DJ sets recorded live at the Garage.

Paradise Garage Top 100 
In the 2000 book Last Night A DJ Saved My Life by Bill Brewster and Frank Broughton, a chart was detailed that listed the "Top 100" of the Paradise Garage, selected by "The Committee". It is unclear whether this list represents the hundred most played songs at the club or the hundred fan-favorite/DJ favorite tracks.

Performers 

Notable performers who have played at Paradise Garage include:

In popular culture

Tribute events
On May 11, 2014, in an event organized by Red Bull Music Academy, former Paradise Garage DJ David DePino, his fellow Paradise Garage alum Joey Llanos, and the dance music DJ François Kevorkian paid tribute to both the Paradise Garage and the late Larry Levan with a block party located on the street outside the club's former entrance. The event was coordinated with an effort to rename the King Street block Larry Levan Way and featured songs considered Garage classics, some DJ'd, some of which were sung live by Jocelyn Brown, who appeared onstage to deliver such favorites as "I'm Caught Up (In a One Night Love Affair)" and "Ain't No Mountain High Enough".
From May 24 to September 22, 2019, the New York Historical Society's Stonewall 50 Exhibition displayed the original Paradise Garage metal sign from the disco's original building, which was a parking garage. Credits also on display read: "Paradise Garage (1976-1987) Dennis Wunderlin (b. 1943), designer. Exterior sign, ca. 1977. Metal, paint. Fales Library and Special Collections, New York University, New York, NY".

Tribute sites
Multiple tribute sites are dedicated to the Paradise Garage, such as paradisegargenyc.com and TheParadiseGarage.net.

Tribute movies
In 2019, the DJ Corrado Rizza directed and produced a documentary movie called Larry's Garage.

See also

 Le Palace, Superclub
 LGBT culture in New York City
 List of electronic dance music venues
 List of nightclubs in New York City
 Prelude Records
 Salsoul Records
 Club Zanzibar
 The Shelter (New York City)

References

External links 

1976 establishments in New York City
1987 disestablishments in New York (state)
Defunct LGBT nightclubs in New York (state)
Electronic dance music venues
Hudson Square
Nightclubs in Manhattan